Innocence of Memories is a 2015 British documentary film written and directed by Grant Gee. Inspired by Orhan Pamuk's 2008 novel The Museum of Innocence, it premiered at the 72nd edition of the Venice Film Festival, being screened as a special event in the Venice Days section.

Cast   
 
  Pandora Colin 	as Ayla 
 Mehmet Ergen 	as Kemal

References

External links  

2015 films
2015 documentary films
British documentary films
2010s English-language films
2010s British films